The Weasel's Tale is a 2019 Argentine-Spanish dark comedy film directed by Juan José Campanella starring Graciela Borges, Oscar Martínez, Luis Brandoni and Marcos Mundstock alongside Clara Lago and Nicolás Francella. It is a remake of 1976 film Yesterday's Guys Used No Arsenic.

Plot 
The plot follows four aged people living in an old mansion (Mara, Pedro and Martín and Norberto), all of them professionally related to the showbiz (respectively lead actress, bit-part actor, screenwriter and director) and how they deal with the arrival of the young Bárbara and Francisco, who are real estate developers wanting to purchase the plot.

Cast

Production 
The screenplay was penned by Juan José Campanella and Darren Kloomok, remaking the 1976 black comedy Yesterday's Guys Used No Arsenic, directed by José Martínez Suárez and written by Martínez Suárez alongside .

Release 
Distributed by BF Paris, the film was theatrically released in Argentina on 16 May 2019. Distributed by Syldavia Cinema, it was theatrically released in Spain on 12 July 2019.

Reception 
On Rotten Tomatoes, the film has an aggregated score of 92% based on 22 positive and 2 negative critic reviews.

Adrian Melo of Página12 considered that the film "misses the homoerotic provocation and sexual ambiguity of the original version"  offering instead "a fable with too many morals and a whiff of social darwinism".

Beatriz Martínez of El Periódico de Catalunya rated the film 3 out of 5 stars, writing that Campanella directs "a twisted, bizarre and macabre story where he reflects human miseries".

Andrea G. Bermejo of Cinemanía also gave the film 3 out of 5 stars, underscoring it to be "a black comedy that shines much more in the script than in the direction", also considering that even if predictable, the ending is "no less enjoyable".

Jonathan Holland of The Hollywood Reporter presented the film as a "slickly calibrated, classically structured dark comedy" summing up as a bottom-line "old-fashioned fare with an up-to-date edge".

Accolades 

|-
| align = center rowspan = "15" | 2020 || rowspan = "4" | 7th Platino Awards || Best Director || Juan José Campanella ||  || rowspan = "4" | 
|-
| Best Actress || Graciela Borges || 
|-
| Best Original Score || Emilio Kauderer || 
|-
| Best Sound || José Luis Díaz || 
|-
| rowspan = "11" | 14th Sur Awards || colspan = "2" | Best Film ||  || rowspan = "11" | 
|-
| Best Director || Juan José Campanella || 
|-
| Best Actress || Graciela Borges || 
|-
| Best Adapted Screenplay || Juan José Campanella, Darren Kloomok || 
|-
| Best Art Direction || Nelson Luty || 
|-
| Best Costume Design || Cecilia Monti || 
|-
| Best Makeup || Osvaldo Esperón, Sylvie Imbert, Beatushka Wojtowicz || 
|-
| Best Cinematography || Félix Chango Monti || 
|-
| Best Sound || José Luis Diaz || 
|-
| Best Editing || Juan José Campanella || 
|-
| Best Original Score || Emilio Kauderer || 
|}

See also 
 List of Argentine films of 2019
 List of Spanish films of 2019

References 

Remakes of Argentine films
Spanish remakes of Argentine films
Argentine black comedy films
Spanish black comedy films
2019 black comedy films
2010s Spanish-language films
Tornasol Films films
2010s Spanish films
2010s Argentine films